Nawab Ganar Khan, also spelt Ganer Khan, was the final dependent Faujdar of Mughal Bengal's Sylhet Sarkar. He was the last Muslim to govern Sylhet although his rule was titular and did not hold much true authority. He held the title of Nawab. Ganar's name was peculiar and uncommon although it is suggested to be the Persian word meaning a soldier at an artillery-house.

Biography
His office started in 1825 (1829 according to Syed Murtaza Ali) during the reign of Mughal emperor Akbar II and titular governorship of the Nawab of Bengal Mubarak Ali Khan II.

A Manipuri chronicle known as Khaki Ngamba mentions an incident which took place during Khan's office. On a Monday in July 1829, two processions were being prepared by Sylhet's Muslim and Hindu communities respectively. The Islamic month of Muharram in the history of Sylhet was a lively time during which tazia processions were common. This happened to fall on the same day as the Hindu festival of Rothjatra (chariot procession). Sensing possible communal violence, Ganar Khan requested the Hindu community to delay their festival by one day. Khan also approached the British and they also accepted his request to defer it. Contrary to the Nawab's statement, Singh challenged the government and a riot emerged between the two communities. During one of the riots, the King of Manipur Gambhir Singh was passing through the city of Sylhet whilst on a British expedition against the Khasis. As a Hindu himself, Singh managed to defend the Hindus and disperse the Muslim rioters with his Manipuri troops. Singh ordered his henchmen; Thondri Singh Chanam Cha, Jai Hey Samsetsapa, Thingbura Nongyaipa Singh, Megha Singh Thangchapa, Jai Singh Ashem Cha and Thingpuwa Phaogaishangpa to fight and punish the Muslims. The Rothjatra was not delayed, and the Manipuri king stayed to take part in it. The Muharram procession however was mercilessly crushed by the Manipuris. Revered by the Hindu community as a defender of their faith, Singh enjoyed the procession and initiated the practice of celebrating Rothjatra and worshipping Jagannath in his own homeland of Manipur.

The ceremonial title of Nawab and Faujdar was abolished after Khan and all formal powers in Sylhet were placed under the District Collector of Sylhet, Charles Tucker, in 1829.

See also
History of Sylhet
Lutfullah Shirazi

References

Rulers of Sylhet
17th-century rulers in Asia
17th-century Indian Muslims